Iryna Shuvalova (born 1986) is a Ukrainian poet, translator and scholar.

Early life and education 
Iryna Shuvalova was born in 1986 in Kyiv. She studied at the Taras Shevchenko National University of Kyiv. In 2014, she completed MA in Comparative literature at Dartmouth College, followed by a PhD in 2020 in Slavonic studies at the University of Cambridge on the topic of songs of the Russo-Ukrainian War created by affected local communities. At Dartmouth she was a recipient of a Fulbright scholarship, while at Cambridge she gained a Gates Cambridge Scholarship and taught Ukrainian.

Career 
Shuvalova debuted in 2011 with her poetry book Ran. Her fourth book, the bilingual publication Pray to the Empty Wells was strongly influenced by Ukrainian folk culture and nature. Her poems have appeared in various anthologies and have been translated into nine languages. In 2019, she was a coeditor of 120 pages of "Sodom": the first anthology of queer literature published in Ukraine.

She works as a translator from English into Ukrainian and from Ukrainian and Russian into English. Shuvalova has translated, among others, Life of Pi by Yann Martel (2016) and Milk and Honey by Rupi Kaur (2019). Her translations into English have appeared in Modern Poetry in Translation and Words Without Borders.

Shuvalova has received a number of awards for her own work as well as translation, including the first prize in the Smoloskyp Literary Competition in 2010 and the Joseph Brodsky/Stephen Spender Prize for translating Sergei Chegra's poem The Prayer of the Touch.

Shuvalova is a member of PEN Ukraine and in 2017 became an expert on Ukrainian translations for the English PEN.

Publications 

 Ran
 Os
 Az
 Pray to the Empty Wells - bilingual publication
 Stoneorchardwoods

References 

Ukrainian translators
Ukrainian women poets
21st-century Ukrainian women writers
Alumni of the University of Cambridge
Dartmouth College alumni
Poets from Kyiv
1986 births
Living people